Pedro Félix Novoa Castillo  (Huacho, 19 November 1974 – 6 March 2021) was a Peruvian writer and educator.

References

Peruvian writers
1974 births
2021 deaths
Place of death missing
Place of birth missing